Enchenberg ( or ; Lorraine Franconian: Enschebärsch) is a commune in the Moselle department of the Grand Est administrative region in north-eastern France.

The village belongs to the Pays de Bitche and to the Northern Vosges Regional Nature Park. As of the 2013 France census, the village's population is 1,272. The inhabitants of the commune are known as Enchenbergeois or Enchenbergeoises.

Geography

Location 

Located east of the Moselle department, the village is part of the Pays de Bitche. Neighboring communes include Bining and Rohrbach-lès-Bitche to the west, Petit-Réderching, Siersthal and Lambach to the north, Lemberg to the east, and Montbronn and Saint-Louis-lès-Bitche to the south.

Neighbouring communes and villages

Administration

Canton and intercommunality
Enchenberg is one of 46 communes in the canton of Bitche. Its general counsels since the French legislative election of 2012 are Anne Mazuy-Harter (DVD) and David Suck (UDI).

The town is part of the Pays de Bitche federation of municipalities which as of January 1, 2017 consists of the same 46 communes as the canton. This grouping is headed by Francis Vogt, municipal counsel of Bitche.

List of successive mayors

Population
In 2017 the commune had 1,239 inhabitants.

Local life

Language
The majority of the inhabitants can speak and/or understand German and also speak French. The local dialect is known as Lorraine Franconian.  Lorraine Franconian is a dialect of German that has been spoken and developed in the region for over a thousand years.

Education
Enchenberg depends on the Academy of Nancy-Metz.

The village is provided with a preschool and a primary school.

To pursue their studies in high school, young Enchenbergeois mainly go to Bitche or Sarreguemines.

Health
Nearby hospitals are located in Bitche, Ingwiller, Sarreguemines, Saverne, Haguenau and Strasbourg.

See also

Bibliography

Related articles 
 Communes of the Moselle department
 Pays de Bitche

References

External links 

 
 
 
 

Communes of Moselle (department)
Moselle communes articles needing translation from French Wikipedia